Walter Wolcott Austin (September 22, 1880 – July 12, 1951) was an American Republican politician  from California.

Early life
Austin was born 1880 in Kendall, Wisconsin, and moved to Chicago, Illinois, with his family, where he was a newsboy at age 7, and to Aberdeen, South Dakota.  In 1912, he moved to San Diego, California.

In San Diego Austin started out as employee of the H. D. Field Safe Co., which he later purchased half-interest then full interest and renamed it Austin Safe and Desk Company. Austin sold the business, and the company later specialised in office furniture then interior design.  Austin entered the real estate and insurance business around 1931, and vice president of Fraser Mortgage Co.

Politics
Austin was elected mayor of San Diego in 1931 as a young reformer. The main issue was the $8.5 million spent for water projects, such as the Lake Hodges Dam, with little to show for it. Austin served as mayor until 1932. In 1940, he supported construction of San Vicente Dam and extending the water system.

While mayor, the city sold unemployment bonds to increase jobs locally.  Funds were spent on projects such as building pedestrian tunnels near schools. Austin also backed establishing a school traffic patrol system.

Austin was the first mayor under a new city charter, approved in the same election that elected him mayor. The charter specified a "weak mayor" or council-manager government.  A City Manager appointed by the City Council managed day-to-day business and the mayor presided over the Council meetings, with no veto power. The motivation was to help stem police corruption, under the idea that an appointed city manager is less subject to bribes and campaign contribution favors than an elected strong Mayor. Council-manager government originated with the Progressive movement in Staunton, Virginia. This form survived until 2006 when it was replaced by a strong mayor city government.

Austin was a long time Republican and was chairman of the Willkie Committee for San Diego in 1940. Austin was founder and president of the Executives Association of San Diego and the San Diego Business Men's Art Club. Austin also was a director of various charities.

Personal life

Austin was one of the first to build a house at Borrego Springs where he spent much time during retirement. He also built a three-story house in Bankers Hill, a San Diego area just north of downtown, in the 1920s.  The Bankers Hill house still includes stained glass that was handmade by Austin.

Austin died on July 12, 1951, at Mercy Hospital in San Diego from complications of appendicitis. He initially fell ill at his Idyllwild, California residence in Riverside County. His children are Genevieve Irene, Virginia Lucille, Warren Wolcott, Gladys Viola, and Edgar Owen.

References

Further reading 
 Obituary, San Diego Union, July 13, 1951, p. 3:3. Includes portrait
 Biographical sketch, San Diego Union, March 24, 1934. Includes portrait as a child

Mayors of San Diego
1880 births
1951 deaths
California Republicans
20th-century American politicians
People from Riverside County, California
People from Borrego Springs, California
People from Monroe County, Wisconsin
Politicians from Aberdeen, South Dakota
Politicians from Chicago